, also known as Disney All Star Sports: Skateboarding in Europe, is a pair of 2002 sports video games released by Konami, one for the GameCube, and the other for the Game Boy Advance. The playable characters include Mickey Mouse, Minnie Mouse, Donald Duck, Goofy, Max Goof and Pete.

Reception

The game received "unfavorable" reviews on both platforms according to the review aggregation website Metacritic. In Japan, Famitsu gave it a score of 29 out of 40 for the GameCube version, and 22 out of 40 for the Game Boy Advance version.

GameSpot said the GameCube version was worse than Disney Sports Basketball. They went on to say: "Disney Sports Skateboarding serves no purpose in this world, save to exemplify and showcase everything that can feasibly go wrong with a skateboarding game." GameSpot also said of the GBA version: "Even if you take into account that Disney Sports Skateboarding is intended for a younger audience, that excuse doesn't explain away all of the game's problems and shortcomings."

References

External links

2002 video games
Skateboarding
Game Boy Advance games
GameCube games
Konami games
Multiplayer and single-player video games
Skateboarding video games
Donald Duck video games
Mickey Mouse video games
Goofy (Disney) video games
Video games developed in Japan